Elliott Himmelberg (born 4 June 1998) is a professional Australian rules footballer playing for  in the Australian Football League (AFL).

Early life
Himmelberg grew up in Wagga Wagga, New South Wales. He moved to Brisbane in Queensland in 2016 where he began playing with Redland. Himmelberg was selected to play for Queensland and the Allies in the 2016 AFL Under 18 Championships. He suffered a broken leg, which stopped him from attending the AFL Draft Combine, and missed the rest of the 2016 season. He was involved with the Lions Academy but was not eligible for exclusive selection in the 2016 AFL draft because he had not spent enough time in Queensland. Himmelberg was selected by Adelaide with pick 51 in the 2016 national draft, their third selection.

AFL career

Adelaide (2018-)
In 2017, Himmelberg played 13 South Australian National Football League (SANFL) games, kicking 19 goals, including four in round 12 against the Port Adelaide Magpies. He suffered a foot injury in July which kept him out for the remainder of the season. In 2018, Himmelberg signed a two-year contract extension, tying him to Adelaide until 2020. He was named in the Adelaide squad for the inaugural AFLX tournament, and as an emergency for the JLT Community Series. He played more often as a ruckman in the SANFL, as fellow key-position players Paul Hunter and Reilly O'Brien suffered injuries. Himmelberg made his AFL debut in round 23 against Carlton at Docklands Stadium. He recorded 13 disposals and five marks, and kicked his first goal with a banana shot. Coach Don Pyke said, "He's performed really well and didn't look out of place at all."

Himmelberg is the brother of Harry Himmelberg, who plays football for the Greater Western Sydney Giants.

References

External links 

 
 

Living people
1998 births
Sportspeople from Wagga Wagga
Redland Football Club players
Adelaide Football Club players
Australian rules footballers from New South Wales
Australian people of American descent